John A. Rogers (born August 24, 1967) is a physical chemist and a materials scientist. He is currently the Louis Simpson and Kimberly Querrey Professor of Materials Science and Engineering, Biomedical Engineering, and Neurological Surgery at Northwestern University.

Professional career
Rogers obtained BA and BS degrees in chemistry and in physics from the University of Texas, Austin in 1989, followed by SM degrees in physics and in chemistry from MIT in 1992 and a PhD degree in physical chemistry from MIT in 1995.  He was a Junior Fellow in the Harvard Society of Fellows from 1995 to 1997, during which time he worked in the laboratory of George M. Whitesides.

He joined the Bell Laboratories as a Member of Technical Staff in the Condensed Matter Physics Research Department in 1997 and served as Director of that department from the end of 2000 through the end of 2002. In 2003 he joined the University of Illinois at Urbana–Champaign as Founder Professor of Engineering, with appointments in the Department of Materials Science and Engineering and the Department of Chemistry.  In 2008 he was named the Flory-Founder Chair in Engineering Innovation, and assumed affiliate appointments with the Department of Mechanical Science and Engineering and the Department of Electrical and Computer Engineering.  From 2010-2012 he was Director of the NSF NSEC Center on Nanomanufacturing.  In 2012, he was appointed to a Swanlund Chair, the highest chaired position at the university and he assumed the position of Director of the Seitz Materials Research Laboratory. He moved to Northwestern University in the Fall of 2016, with an appointment as the first Louis Simpson and Kimberly Querrey Professor, with appointments in the Department of Materials Science and Engineering, the Department of Biomedical Engineering and the Department of Neurological Surgery, with affiliate appointments in the Department of Chemistry, the Department of Mechanical Engineering, the Department of Electrical and Computer Engineering and the Department of Dermatology.  He also became the first Director of the newly endowed Center for Bio-Integrated Electronics, which was elevated to the Institute of Bioelectronics in 2019 through an additional contribution to the endowment by Kimberly Querrey and Louis Simpson, trustees at Northwestern University.

Current research
Rogers' research seeks to exploit characteristics of 'soft' materials, such as polymers, liquid crystals, and biological tissues as well as hybrid combinations of them with unusual classes of micro/nanomaterials, in the form of ribbons, wires, membranes, tubes or related. The aim is to control and induce novel electronic and photonic responses in these materials; and also develop new 'soft lithographic' and biomimetic approaches for patterning them and guiding their growth. This work combines fundamental studies with forward-looking engineering efforts in a way that promotes positive feedback between the two. Current research focuses on soft materials for conformal electronics, nanophotonic structures, microfluidic devices, and microelectromechanical systems, all lately with an emphasis on bio-inspired and bio-integrated technologies. Applications of this research have included dissolvable, wireless pacemakers, optogenetic brain implants, and environmental sensors.

Awards and achievements
Rogers' research deals with nano and molecular scale fabrication, materials, and patterning techniques for electronic and photonic devices, lately with a strong emphasis on bio-integrated systems. He has published over 850 papers (>160,000 citations, per Google Scholar), and is an inventor on over 100 patents and patent applications, more than 50 of which are licensed or in current use. More than 100 former PhD students and postdoctoral fellows from his group are now in faculty at some of the most competitive institutions in the world - Stanford, MIT, Northwestern, Duke, Dartmouth, Univ. Illinois, Georgia Tech, Univ Southern Calif, Penn State, Texas A&M Univ, Purdue Univ, NCSU and many others in the US; TU Delft, Univ. Heidelberg and others in Europe; Tsinghua Univ, Peking Univ, USTC and many others in China; Seoul National Univ, KAIST, Yonsei Univ and many others in Korea.  He is one of ~25 people in history to have been elected to all three US national academies—National Academy of Engineering, National Academy of Sciences and National Academy of Medicine.

Selected honors 
James Prize in Science and Technology Integration, US National Academy of Sciences (2022),
 Inducted as a Laureate of The Lincoln Academy of Illinois and awarded the Order of Lincoln (the State’s highest honor) by the Governor of Illinois on November 6, 2021.
Guggenheim Fellowship (2021).
Monie Ferst Award for teaching and research supervision, Sigma Xi (2021),
Nancy DeLoye Fitzroy and Roland V. Fitzroy Medal, ASME, American Society for Mechanical Engineers (2020),
 Herbert Pardes Clinical Research Excellence Award, The Clinical Research Forum (2020),
 Benjamin Franklin Medal for Materials Engineering from the Franklin Institute (2019),
 MRS Medal of the Materials Research Society (2018),
 Nadai Medal of the American Society of Mechanical Engineers (2017),
 IEEE EMBS Trailblazer Award, IEEE Engineering in Medicine and Biology Society (2016),
 ETH Zurich Chemical Engineering Medal (2015),
 A.C. Eringen Medal of the Society for Engineering Science (2014),  
 Smithsonian Award for American Ingenuity in the Physical Sciences (2013),
 Robert Henry Thurston Award from the American Society of Mechanical Engineers (2013),  
 Lemelson-MIT Prize (2011)
 MacArthur Fellowship (2009)
 George Smith Award from the IEEE (2009)  
 Leo Hendrick Baekeland Award from the American Chemical Society (2007)  
 Member, National Academy of Engineering (2011)
 Member, National Academy of Sciences (2015)
 Member, National Academy of Medicine (2019)
 Member, American Academy of Arts and Sciences ( 2014)
 Fellow of the Institute of Electrical and Electronics Engineers (2009)
 Fellow of the American Physical Society (2006)
 Fellow of the Materials Research Society (2007)
 Fellow of the American Association for the Advancement of Science (2008)
 Fellow of the National Academy of Inventors ( 2013)
 Doctorate honoris causa from the École polytechnique fédérale de Lausanne (EPFL). (2013) and the University of Houston (2021).

References

Further reading

External links
 Northwestern University Website
 Querrey-Simpson Institute for Bioelectronics
 John Rogers' Research Group Website

Living people
University of Texas at Austin College of Natural Sciences alumni
Massachusetts Institute of Technology School of Science alumni
University of Illinois Urbana-Champaign faculty
MacArthur Fellows
Fellows of the American Physical Society
Fellows of the American Academy of Arts and Sciences
Members of the United States National Academy of Engineering
Members of the United States National Academy of Sciences
Members of the National Academy of Medicine
Fellows of the American Association for the Advancement of Science
1967 births
MIT Department of Physics alumni
American scientists